Lithuanian partisans is a generic term used during World War II by Nazi officials and quoted in books by modern historians to describe Lithuanian anti-communist fighters, thus collaborators with the Nazis during the first months of the German occupation of Lithuania during World War II. A part of the Lithuanian partisans who fought against the Red Army during the June Uprising, were later organized into various auxiliary units by German Nazis. A minority of the units assisted and actively participated in mass executions of the Lithuanian Jews mostly in June–August 1941.

The term "Lithuanian partisans" might apply to several different and unrelated groups during 1941 and later:

 A group led by Nazi agent Algirdas Klimaitis and active in Kaunas at the end of June 1941
 Tautinio Darbo Apsaugos Batalionas (TDA) was formed in Kaunas as basis for independent Lithuanian army, but soon transformed into a Nazi auxiliary unit participating in executions of the Jews at the Seventh and Ninth Forts
 Rollkommando Hamann and its Lithuanian auxiliaries from TDA, responsible for mass murders in the countryside
 Lithuanian Police Battalions formed in Vilnius from 3,600 deserters from the 29th Lithuanian Territorial Corps of the Red Army
 Ypatingasis būrys formed in Vilnius and participant in the Ponary massacre

References 

1941 in Lithuania
The Holocaust in Lithuania
Lithuanian collaboration with Nazi Germany